= FK Dukla =

FK Dukla may refer to:

- FK Dukla Prague, a Czech football team
- FK Dukla Banská Bystrica, a Slovak football team
